University of East Anglia Football Club is a football club based in Norwich, England, and are the football team of the University of East Anglia.

History
In 2007, University of East Anglia joined the Anglian Combination. In 2019, following six promotions in the Anglian Combination system, the club were promoted to the Premier Division. In 2021, the club was admitted into the Eastern Counties League Division One. The club entered the FA Vase for the first time in 2021–22.

Ground
In 2020, University of East Anglia moved to Aldiss Park, groundsharing with Dereham Town. Prior to moving to the ground, the club used the university's facilities at Colney Lane in Norwich.

References

University of East Anglia
Football clubs in England
Football clubs in Norfolk
University and college football clubs in England
Anglian Combination
Eastern Counties Football League